Karen A. Swassjan, *1948 in Tbilisi, is an Armenian philosopher, literary critic, historian of culture and anthroposophist. He is one of the best known contemporary philosophers in the Russian-speaking world.

Karen Swassjan studied philosophy as well as English and French philology at Yerevan State University, where he wrote his doctoral thesis on Henri Bergson and became a professor. He has translated and edited works by Rainer Maria Rilke, Friedrich Nietzsche and Oswald Spengler into Russian, and has written numerous works on philosophy, literature, history of ideas and anthroposophy in Russian and German. In 1994–95 he was honoured by the Alexander von Humboldt Foundation for his work as a researcher and teacher. In 2009 he won the first prize in an essay competition organized by the Institute of Philosophy of the Russian Academy of Science. Karen Swassjan writes and lectures in Basle, Switzerland, where he lives at present.

For more detailed information, see the German or Russian version of this article.

Major works
In English
 The Ultimate Communion of Mankind: A Celebration of Rudolf Steiner's Book "The Philosophy of Freedom", 

In German
Verschüttete Welt. Aufsätze – Studien – Essays. Edition Nadelöhr, Aarau 2021, 

Philosophische Postskripta. Edition Nadelöhr, Aarau 2020,

Andrej Belyj. Drei Essays. Edition Nadelöhr, Aarau 2019, 

Europa. Zwei Abgesänge. EM Edition Morel, Dornach 2018, 
Rudolf Steiner: Eine Einführung. EM Edition Morel, Dornach 2017, 
 Geschichte der Philosophie in karmischer Perspektive: Ein Nachruf auf das Denken von Plato bis Stirner. Verlag für Anthroposophie, Dornach 2016, 
 Geträumt oder gewollt? Zwölf Skizzen über die Schweiz. Verlag für Anthroposophie, Dornach 2014,  Zur Geschichte der Zukunft. Drei Essays. Verlag für Anthroposophie, Dornach 2009, 
Aufgearbeitete Anthroposophie. Eine Geisterfahrt, Verlag am Goetheanum, Dornach 2007; 2. erweiterte Aufl.: Dornach 2008, 
Rudolf Steiner. Ein Kommender, Verlag am Goetheanum, 2. erg. Aufl. Dornach 2017, 
Anthroposophische Heilpädagogik. Zur Geschichte eines Neuanfangs, Verlag am Goetheanum, Dornach 2004, 
 (als Herausgeber) Louis M. I. Werbeck: Die Gegner Rudolf Steiners und der Anthroposophie, durch sich selbst widerlegt, Forum für Geisteswissenschaft, Wallisellen 2003.
Was ist Anthroposophie?, Verlag am Goetheanum, Dornach 2001,  Textauszug (PDF)
Das Schicksal heisst: Goethe, Rudolf Geering Verlag, Dornach 1999, 
 (als Herausgeber) Karl Ballmer: Umrisse einer Christologie der Geisteswissenschaft. Texte und Briefe, Rudolf Geering Verlag, Dornach 1999, 
Der Untergang eines Abendländers. Oswald Spengler und sein Requiem auf Europa, Heinrich Verlag, Berlin 1998, 
 (als Herausgeber) Max Stirner: Das unwahre Prinzip unserer Erziehung. Einleitung von Willy Storrer, Nachwort von Karen Swassjan, Rudolf Geering Verlag, Dornach 1997, 
 Urphänomene II. Die Zerstörung der Kultur: 1. Streiflichter / 2. Lichtblicke, 2 Bände, Rudolf Geering Verlag, Dornach 1996–1998,  / 
 Urphänomene I. Die Überwindung der Philosophie / Die Umwandlung der Theosophie / Die Erschaffung der Anthroposophie, 3 Bände, Rudolf Geering Verlag, Dornach 1995, 
Nietzsche – Versuch einer Gottwerdung. Zwei Variationen über ein Schicksal, Verlag am Goetheanum, Dornach 1994, 
Die Karl-Ballmer-Probe. Mit zwei Aufsätzen von Karl Ballmer (Co-Author), Edition LGC, Siegen/Sancey le Grand 1994, 
Das Abendmahl des Menschen. Zum hundertsten Geburtstag der ‚Philosophie der Freiheit‘, Verlag am Goetheanum, Dornach 1993, 
Unterwegs nach Damaskus. Zur geistigen Situation zwischen Ost und West, Verlag Urachhaus, Stuttgart 1993, 

In Russian
... но ещё ночь, Evidentis, АВТ Центр. — М., 2013. 
Очерк философии в самоизложении, Институт общегуманитарных исследований. — М., 2015. 
Р.М. Рильке Сонеты к Орфею в переводе К.А. Свасьяна, Отдельное издание. Evidentis, АВТ Центр. — М., 2012. 
Человек в лабиринте идентичностей, Evidentis. — М., 2009. 
Растождествления, Evidentis, Москва 2006
О конце истории философии, 2005
Загадка истории философии // Русский журнал, 2002
Европа. Два некролога, Москва 2003
Становление европейской науки, Ереван 1990, 2-е изд. Москва 2002
Философское мировоззрение Гёте, Ереван 1983, 2-е изд. Москва 2001
Ницше, или как становятся Богом. Две вариации на одну судьбу, Ереван 1999
Освальд Шпенглер и его реквием по Западу // Освальд Шпенглер: Закат Европы. Очерки морфологии мировой истории. Т.1. М., 1993 (Вступительная статья)
Фридрих Ницше: Мученик познания // Фридрих Ницше. Соч. в 2 т. Т.1. М., 1990 (Вступительная статья)
Философия символических форм Э. Кассирера. Критический анализ, Ереван 1989
Иоганн Вольфганг Гёте, Москва 1989
Судьба математики в истории познания Нового времени // ВФ. 1989 No. 12
Человек как творение и творец культуры // ВФ. 1987. No. 6
Феноменологическое познание. Пропедевтика и критика, Ереван 1987
Голоса безмолвия. Рильке, Валери, Блок, Чаренц, Нарекаци, Гете, Ереван 1984
Проблема символа в современной философии, Ереван 1981
Эстетическая сущность интуитивной философии А. Бергсона, Ереван 1978

External links
Karen Swassjan's biography

(In Russian):
 "Russian Virtual Library" with a collection of works by K. Swassjan
 Интервью веб-журналу "Эксперт online 2.0"
 "Литературный канал" с выбором сочинений К.А. Свасьяна
 Лекция К.А. Свасьяна "О конце истории философии"
 Статья К.А. Свасьяна "Загадка истории философии"
 Статья К. А. Свасьяня "Фридрих Ницше: Мученик познания"
 "Ориентация на Запад есть ориентация на безумие", газета “Новое Время”, 2 сентября, 2000 г.
 Интервью теоретическому журналу “Credo New”, N4, 2005
 Oн-лайн интервью для Open Armenia Forum, 4 августа, 2005
 Интервью сайту Nietzsche.ru

1948 births
Living people
Writers from Tbilisi
Russian philosophers
Armenian philosophers
Anthroposophists
Georgian people of Armenian descent
Russian people of Armenian descent